The Pacific Coast Collegiate Sailing Conference (PCCSC) is one of the seven conferences within the Inter-Collegiate Sailing Association, the governing body for collegiate competition in the sport of sailing.

The PCCSC consists mostly of teams from California, but also includes teams from Hawaii and Arizona.  The conference was formerly known as the Pacific Coast Intercollegiate Yacht Racing Association (PCIYRA).

Notable Alumni include C Fleet Hero, Neil 'Haydon' Stapleton (UCSB '18).

Members

References

External links
 PCCSC

ICSA conferences